The 2027 AFC Asian Cup qualification is the qualification process organized by the Asian Football Confederation (AFC) to determine the participating teams for the 2027 AFC Asian Cup, the 19th edition of the international men's football championship of Asia. Since 2019, the Asian Cup final tournament is contested by 24 teams, having been expanded from the 16-team format that was used from 2004 to 2015.

The qualification process involves four rounds, where the first two rounds double as the 2026 FIFA World Cup qualification for Asian teams.

Format
The qualification structure is as follows:
First round: 22 teams (ranked 26–47) will play home-and-away over two legs.
The eleven winners advance to the second round.
One best ranked losing team will advance to the third round of Asian Cup qualification.
Second round: 36 teams (ranked 1–25 and eleven first-round winners) are divided into nine groups of four teams to play home-and-away double round-robin matches.
The eighteen group winners and group runners-up advance to the third round of 2026 FIFA World Cup qualifiers and qualify for the 2027 AFC Asian Cup along with host Saudi Arabia.
The remaining 18 advance directly to the third round of Asian Cup qualification.
Play-off round: 10 losing teams from the first round will compete in home-and-away two-legged play-off matches that determine the final five qualifiers for the third round.
Third round: The 24 teams (one best ranked losing team from first round + 18 third and fourth-placed teams from the second round + 5 winners from the play-off round) will be divided into six groups of four teams to play home-and-away double round-robin matches and the winner of each group will occupy the remaining six slots for the Asian Cup.

Entrants
All 47 AFC-affiliated nations are eligible. The FIFA World Rankings at the time of the draw are used to determine which nations would compete in the first round. For seeding in the second round and third round draws, the most recent FIFA Rankings prior to those draws will be used. Northern Mariana Islands are eligible to qualify to the 2027 AFC Asian Cup after their affiliation with the AFC in 2020.

Due to the joint format of the World Cup and Asian Cup qualifiers, Saudi Arabia (as the host nation of the 2027 Asian Cup) will enter the second round of Asian Cup qualifiers.

Schedule
The schedule of the competition is expected to be as follows, according to the AFC Competitions Calendar.

First round

Ranking of best losing teams

Second round

Group A

Group B

Group C

Group D

Group E

Group F

Group G

Group H

Group I

Play-off round

Third round

Group A

Group B

Group C

Group D

Group E

Group F

Qualified teams
A total of 24 teams will qualify for the final tournament including the host Saudi Arabia.

See also
 2026 FIFA World Cup qualification (AFC)

Notes

References

Qualification
2027
2023 in Asian football
2024 in Asian football
2025 in Asian football
2026 in Asian football